Joël Fabrice Goho Bah Thomas (born 30 June 1987) is a French footballer who last played for Andorran Primera Divisió side UE Engordany.

Club career
Thomas joined Bordeaux in 2005, and spent two years with them, before moving to Germany with Kaiserslautern. In August 2008, he had a trial with Premier League club Wigan Athletic in August. Shortly after that, Thomas joined Hamilton Accies. He scored in the League Cup tie against Clyde.

He signed for Colchester for a fee of £125,000, on 21 July 2009 from Hamilton Academical.

He rejoined Hamilton Accies on loan in January 2010.

His contract with Colchester United was terminated by mutual consent on 31 July 2010.

On 12 August 2010, Hamilton signed free agent Thomas for a third time ahead of the new SPL season.

Thomas signed a contract of six-month in Greece for Ionikos on 27 January 2011.

In June 2013, Thomas signed a contract for three years with Dinamo București. His first goals for Dinamo were scored in a Romanian Cup game, against Chindia Târgoviște. He was released in December 2015.

On 1 March 2016, it was confirmed that Thomas had signed for Raith Rovers.

In February 2019, he joined UE Engordany.

International career
Thomas is eligible to play for France through birth, Ivory Coast through lineage, and was coveted by Mali, while he was playing for Colchester.

References

External links
 
 
 
 
 
 

1987 births
Footballers from Caen
Living people
French footballers
Association football forwards
FC Girondins de Bordeaux players
1. FC Kaiserslautern II players
Hamilton Academical F.C. players
Colchester United F.C. players
Ionikos F.C. players
CS Turnu Severin players
FC Dinamo București players
Raith Rovers F.C. players
FC Dordrecht players
TOP Oss players
UE Engordany players
English Football League players
Scottish Premier League players
Scottish Professional Football League players
Liga I players
Eerste Divisie players
Primera Divisió players
French expatriate footballers
French expatriate sportspeople in Germany
Expatriate footballers in Germany
French expatriate sportspeople in England
Expatriate footballers in England
French expatriate sportspeople in Scotland
Expatriate footballers in Scotland
French expatriate sportspeople in Greece
Expatriate footballers in Greece
French expatriate sportspeople in Romania
Expatriate footballers in Romania